Yademan (also Romanized as Yādemān) is a village in Tangeh Soleyman Rural District, Kolijan Rostaq District, Sari County, Mazandaran Province, Iran. At the 2006 census, it had 23 families, and a population of 66.

References 

Populated places in Sari County